AdoCbi kinase/AdoCbi-phosphate guanylyltransferase may refer to:
 Adenosylcobinamide-phosphate guanylyltransferase, an enzyme
 Adenosylcobinamide kinase, an enzyme